Cyril Dion is a French writer, film director, poet, and activist.

Early life and education 
After studying at the École d'art dramatique Jean-Périmony (drama school) and a very brief career as an actor, Cyril Dion coordinated projects for the 'Fondation Hommes de Parole'. He organized an Israeli-Palestinian congress at Caux in 2003, 2005 and 2006, and the first and second world Congress of Imams and Rabbis for peace in Brussels and Sevilla.

Writing and film career
He has written poetry since he was 17 and published in 2014 a collection of poems (Sitting on the edge) Assis sur le fil, Table Ronde Editions.

He wrote and co-produced with Mélanie Laurent the documentary film Tomorrow (Demain), released in movie theatres in France on 2 December 2015; as well as two books published by Actes Sud in France and translated into English, German, Italian, Spanish, Chinese, Korean. Tomorrow won the Cesar award for Best Documentary (Oscar equivalent in France) in 2016 and over one million people went to see it in movie theatres in France. It was later released in over 30 countries. It is cited by many French people as the trigger for a new kind of engagement in the course of the following years. For the French newspaper Libération "Cyril Dion succeeds in one hour and fifty-eight minutes, what decades of environmental struggle failed to do: lay the foundations for a" new collective fiction". It was shown at the 2017 Wales One World Film Festival in the UK. In the US, the movie was critic's pick of The New York Times, and gained a 93% approval rating on Rotten Tomatoes.

In September 2016, he was president of the jury of the documentary movie in Festival Biarritz Amérique latine. In October he was the Godfather of festival Atmosphère with the French singer Camille and the FIFF Campus in Namur, Belgium.

Between March and June 2017, he is the key proponent of the tour: "the song of Hummingbirds, the call of the world of tomorrow". Seven concerts throughout France brought artists together to perform, he performed with about forty artists including Alain Souchon, Matthieu Chedid, Izia, Dominique A, Albin de la Simone, Arthur H, Zaz, Tryo , Emily Loizeau, Jeanne Cherhal, Bastien Lallemant, Piers Faccini, Gael Faure, Xavier Polycarpe, Sebastien Hoog. Cyril Dion punctuated the performance with poetry readings of his book "Assis sur le fil" and texts from the book "Tomorrow".

In August 2017, he published his first novel published by Actes Sud: Imago (not translated in English). The book is well received by critics and booksellers. For Libération, "the co-director of the film Tomorrow, delivers a first novel that a fast pitch can serve. However, if he gave himself up to the perilous exercise of the subject three times in a row, he took the side of his four characters, with an uncompromising empathy and a haunting writing.

In May 2018, he publishes "Petit manuel de resistance contemporaine" (A small manual of contemporary resistance) at Actes Sud. As soon as it was published, the book ranked in the best-selling essays. For Charlotte Bloch in the French weekly magazine L'Express: "Far from being moralistic or utopian, this incisive little book full of ideas is a real breath of fresh air because of its particular approach to modern ecology. Here, we do not beat around the bush, but we ask questions while trying to find practical and constructive answers. "The book is translated in German, Spanish, Italian, Chinese, Japanese, Korean but not yet in English.

On 11 December 2018 his second film, After Tomorrow (Après-Demain), was broadcast on France 2 in France and then on RTBF in Belgium and RTS in Switzerland. Commissioned by French Public Service Television (France 2), it was meant to accompany the first TV broadcast of Tomorrow. The intention of this 71-minute documentary was to meet people who implemented projects after seeing the documentary Tomorrow. As in his book "Petit Manuel de Résistance Contemporaine", he develops the thesis that stories play a preponderant role in the evolution of society. "This is the conclusion of After Tomorrow: things change when there are enough people who tell a new story and engage in a non-violent street fight, such as civil rights or women's rights".

On 21 May 2019 he created with the guitarist and composer Sébastien Hoog, the show Résistances Poétiques at the Maison de la Poésie in Paris, which mixes poetry and music. A tour organised by Décibels Productions was planned for 2021. For Cyril Dion :"Faced with the prospect of an ecological collapse, immersed in the digital age, caught up in the whirlwind of information, confronted with violence and inequality, we need poetry, beauty and music. Reading and writing poetry is already resistance to a world obsessed with financial return, performance and consumerism. It means taking the time to listen to the din inside us and to tap into our creative, spiritual resources to cope. And trying to build another future."In September 2019 he begins shooting his third film Animal which is due to be released in October 2020.
In 2022 the film Animal won the Green Award at the Trento Film Festival.

Climate activism 
In 2007, he founded with a few friends, the ecological movement Colibris (hummingbird in French). He was director until July 2013. In 2010, he was advisor and co-producer with Colibris of the movie Think global act Local by Coline Serreau. In 2012, he co-founded Kaizen magazine, and was editor in chief from March 2012 to April 2014. He is also Editor in Chief of the Domaine du Possible (The field of possibilities) collection of the French publisher Actes Sud with Jean-Paul Capitani.

He is one of the leading figures in the French climate movement that organised climate marches starting in September 2018. He spoke at the March on 13 October calling for the movement to be amplified and given a strategy. On 4 December, he called on the yellow jacket movement to join the climate marches, considering that :"If we lose this battle, there will be no more purchasing power to defend or democracy to protect. There will only be wars, shortages and an unliveable planet. The good news is that the reason the planet is devastated is the same reason that causes relocations, modern slavery in factories, which leads the rich to become richer and the rest of the population to become poorer: an economic system whose obsession is profit, in the short term, at any price, and which concentrates wealth in a few hands. »
On 18 December 2018, he took part in the action L'Affaire du Siècle, launched by four NGOs (Greenpeace, Oxfam France, la Fondation Nicolas Hulot and Notre affaire à tous). Their common goal: take the French State to court for not acting on climate change. In a few days online mobilization beats all the petition records in France and gather 2,17 million signatories.

In January 2019, he is part of the Citizens' Vests collective which calls for the creation of a "citizens' assembly" drawn by lot and operating according to the principles of deliberative democracy to get out "from above" of the Yellow Vests crisis. On 13 February, he met with Emmanuel Macron and actress Marion Cotillard and proposed to the president to set up such an assembly to seek solutions on the citizens' initiative referendum, ecological transition and fiscal justice. On 13 April 2019, he explains in an interview with Le Monde why he believes that only collective intelligence can provide solutions to a problem as complex as the climate crisis. In it, he is critical of the great national debate organized by the government and believes that : "If we want to achieve results that are shared by all, we need to redistribute power, and to build this complementarity between representative democracy and direct democracy. With this Citizens' Assembly, it is not a question of making a move, as was the case with the great debate, but of demonstrating that we can integrate these mechanisms into our democracies on a permanent basis."The Convention gives rise to 149 measures. Emmanuel Macron announces 146 on 29 June, announces a referundum on Article 1 of the Constitution and the examination of a major law taking up these proposals in fall.

Awards 
Won
 Festival du film de Sarlat 2015: Salamandre d'Or (prix du public)
 Festival Ram Dam de Tournai en 2016: Best documentary award
 César 2016: César du meilleur film documentaire: Best documentary award
 Festival COLCOA Los Angeles 2016: Best documentary award 
 Prix Saint-Just de Narbonne 2016
Docteur Honoris Causa of the Namur University (4 October 2016)
Blue Planet Award Nausicaa 2017 - Novel category for Demain et après...
Mediterranean Award (Prix Méditerranée) 2018 for 1st novel Imago.

Nominated
 Prix Lumière 2016: Best documentary award
Stanislas 2017 Award : best first novel
Style Award 2017
Première plume 2017 Award

Filmography 
Tomorrow (Demain), co-directed with Mélanie Laurent, produce by Move Movie, released 2 December 2015
After tomorrow, documentary co-directed with Laure Noualhat, 2018
Animal, a movie in which Dion travels with two young environmental activists around the world, to discover the complexity of the obstacles to a real transition and the beauty of the endangered biodiversity, 2022.

Bibliography 
Poetry
 Assis sur le fil, éditions La Table Ronde, 2014

Essays
Tomorrow: All Over the Globe, Solutions Already Exist, Chelsea Green publishing and Actes Sud publishing, 2017.
Petit manuel de résistance contemporaine : Récits et stratégies pour transformer le monde, Éditions Actes Sud, coll. « Domaine du possible », mai 2018

Novel
Imago, Editions Actes Sud, Domaine français, 2017

Children's books

Demain, les aventures de Léo, Lou et Pablo à la recherche d'un monde meilleur (with Mélanie Laurent), éd. Actes Sud Junior / L'amandier, 2015
Demain entre tes mains, (avec Pierre Rabhi), éditions Actes Sud Junior, 2017

Other
 Foreword to the French edition of George Marshall's Don't Even Think About It: Why Our Brains Are Wired to Ignore Climate Change (Actes Sud, 2017).
Foreword to the French edition of Paul Hawken's Drawdown (Actes Sud, 2018)

References

External links

 

1978 births
Living people
People from Poissy
French film directors